Li Daimo (born 9 May 1988 in Qiqihar, Heilongjiang), also known as Demon Li, is a Chinese singer who rose to fame after being discovered during the first season of The Voice of China.

Biography

The voice of China 
Li learned clarinet and singing in his childhood, and attended Shenyang Conservatory of Music. He was overweight while a university student, but achieved a slim figure prior to his participation in The Voice of China through a strict diet.

In 2012, Li took part in the first season of The Voice of China, singing Wanting Qu's You Exist in My Song, and was selected to join the team of mentor Liu Huan.

Music career 
After ending the contes, Li released 2 solo albums: "My Voice", and "Sensitive", that were well received by the Chinese audience. Some of the songs from those albums were released as image themes for films TV Dramas such as the song "Say yes" from the movie"101 marriage".

In July 2013, Li came out as a gay man, and gained overwhelming support from netizens on China's popular microblogging site Sina Weibo.

On 17 March 2014, Li was arrested by Beijing police due to drug possession. On 27 May 2014, the court found Li guilty, and sentenced him to nine months and fined him 2,000 Yuan. He was released from prison in December 2014, after serving seven months in prison, earlier than his original nine-month sentence, due to good behavior.

After being released from prison, Li resumed his music career and started preparing his new projects. In 2016, after two years of work, the performer released his fourth studio album and performed again in various television shows. Since then, the singer continued his activity composing new songs and collaborating with other artists and also performing with others.

In 2017, Li released a new album entitled "Come, I'm here", released under the label Dream Ring Entertainment which also included one song in English.

Discography

Studio albums 

"My Voice" (2012)
"Sensitive" (2013)
"There is no "just nice" in love" (2013)
"Thank you" (2016)
"Come, I'm here" (2017)

Singles 

 Simple things
 Codice
 In my song
 I'm the one you love the most?
 Wound
 If you aren't here
 Regret
 In my bones
 I can't get it
 I loved that face

References

External links

1988 births
Living people
People from Qiqihar
Singers from Heilongjiang
Chinese Mandopop singers
The Voice of China contestants
21st-century Chinese male singers